Epidesmia is a genus of moths in the family Geometridae erected by Duncan and Westwood in 1841.

Species
 Epidesmia brachygrammella Lower, 1893
 Epidesmia chilonaria (Herrich-Schäffer, [1855])
 Epidesmia hypenaria (Guenée, 1857)
 Epidesmia oxyderces Meyrick, 1890
 Epidesmia perfabricata (Walker, 1861)
 Epidesmia phoenicina Turner, 1929
 Epidesmia reservata (Walker, 1861)
 Epidesmia tricolor Duncan [& Westood], 1841
 Epidesmia tryxaria (Guenée, 1857)

References

Oenochrominae